Harmony High School (often abbreviated to HHS) is located in Harmony, Florida, United States. It is one of nine schools in the Osceola County School District.

Academics 
Harmony offers a large array of courses in regular, honor, and Advanced Placement. Harmony offers Advanced Placement in Linguistics for English Language and English Literature, Advanced Placement in Math for Statistics and Calculus, Advanced Placement in Science for Biology, Environmental Science, Chemistry, and Physics, Advanced Placement in Social Studies for Human Geography, World History, U.S. History, Macroeconomics, U.S. Government, and Psychology, and Advanced Placement in Languages for Spanish and French. Harmony also offers language courses in Italian. Along with Advanced Placement, Harmony also offers Dual Enrollment, provided by Valencia College, for all students.

Harmony High School is also a magnet school for Digital Video Production, Digital Media, Gaming and Simulation, Engineering, Agriscience, veterinary Assistance, and Fashion Design. Harmony has a fully functioning veterinary program, which uses real-world teachings to teach. Harmony is also home to its own Junior ROTC.

Extracurricular activities 
Harmony offers the following clubs:

Art Club
Best Buddies
Creative Writing Club
Ballroom Dance
DECA
Drama Club
Drill Team
FBLA/BPA
Fellowship of Christian Athletes
FCCLA
FFA
French Club
French Honor Society
Interact Club
International Travel Club
Italian Club
Key Club
Longhorn Legion
Sound of The Stampede Marching Band
National Honor Society
Photography Club
Physics Club
Raiders
Robotics Club
Satellite Club
Spanish Club
Special Olympics
Student Government
Technology Student Association
Tri-M Music Honor Societies
Thespian International Honor Society
Yearbook
Color Guard
Winter Guard
Jazz Band
String Orchestra
Beach Ocean Activist Club

Athletics 
Harmony High School is a member of the FHSAA and the Orange Belt Conference. The Longhorn football team went 10–3 in 2008 reaching the regional championship. In 2015 the football team went 9-2 after bowing out in 1st round playoff action. Harmony's rivals are the Osceola Kowboys and St. Cloud Bulldogs. Harmony High School offers the following sports:
 
Baseball
Basketball
Cross Country
Flag Football
Football
Golf
Cheerleading
Soccer
Swimming and Diving
Tennis
Track and Field
Volleyball
Weightlifting
Wrestling
Marching Band
Color Guard
Winter Guard

Demographics 
 
 School enrollment: 2014
 White students: 58.6%
 Multiracial: 34.4%
 Pacific Islander: 0.1%
 Black students: 4.6%
 Asian students: 1.8%
 Native American students: 0.5% 
 Female students: 47.0%
 Male students: 53.0%

References

External links 
 

Educational institutions established in 2004
High schools in Osceola County, Florida
Public high schools in Florida
2004 establishments in Florida